The 1966 Men's Asian Games Volleyball Tournament was the 3rd edition of the event, organized by the Asian governing body, the AVC. It was held in Bangkok, Thailand from 10 to 19 December 1966.

Results

Preliminary round

Pool A

Pool B

Pool C

Classification 7th–12th

Final round

Final standing

References
 Results

External links
OCA official website

Men's Volleyball